The 33rd G8 summit was held at Kempinski Grand Hotel, 6–8 June 2007. The summit took place in Heiligendamm in the Northern German state of Mecklenburg-Vorpommern on the Baltic Coast. The locations of previous G8 summits to have been hosted by Germany include Bonn (1978, 1985), Munich (1992) and Cologne (1999).

Overview
The Group of Seven (G7) was an unofficial forum which brought together the heads of the richest industrialized countries: France, Germany, Italy, Japan, the United Kingdom, the United States and Canada starting in 1976. The G8, meeting for the first time in 1997, was formed with the addition of Russia. In addition, the President of the European Commission has been formally included in summits since 1981. The summits were not meant to be linked formally with wider international institutions; and in fact, a mild rebellion against the stiff formality of other international meetings was a part of the genesis of cooperation between France's President Giscard d'Estaing and West Germany's Chancellor Helmut Schmidt as they conceived the initial summit of the Group of Six (G6) in 1975.

The G8 summits during the 21st century have inspired widespread debates, protests and demonstrations; and the two- or three-day event becomes more than the sum of its parts, elevating the participants, the issues and the venue as focal points for activist pressure.

Leaders at the summit

The G8 is an unofficial annual forum for the leaders of Canada, the European Commission, France, Germany, Italy, Japan, Russia, the United Kingdom and the United States.

The 33rd G8 summit was the first summit for French President Nicolas Sarkozy. It was also the last for British Prime Minister Tony Blair, Italian Prime Minister Romano Prodi and Russian President Vladimir Putin.  It was also the only summit for Japanese Prime Minister Shinzō Abe (Abe and Putin would return to the 39th G8 summit six years later)

Participants
These summit participants are the current "core members" of the international forum:

Priorities

Traditionally, the host country of the G8 summit sets the agenda for negotiations, which take place primarily amongst multi-national civil servants in the weeks before the summit itself, leading to a joint declaration which all countries can agree to sign. In any event, security for the world leaders and for the venue remained a high priority throughout.

Issues
The summit was intended as a venue for resolving differences among its members. As a practical matter, the summit was also conceived as an opportunity for its members to give each other mutual encouragement in the face of difficult economic decisions. The G8's traditional focus on macroeconomic issues and trade continued to be important, but this core was augmented by an expanded focus on the environment, meeting Millennium Development Goals and cross-border security issues like terrorism.  Trans-national crime also remained in the forefront of summit issues.

Schedule and agenda
At the end of the 32nd G8 summit in Russia, German Chancellor Angela Merkel reported that the agenda of the G8 summit in 2007 had not been determined, but "the struggle against poverty across the globe will be a priority."

According to the official German Presidency website, the summit's motto was "Growth and Responsibility," focusing on "Investition, Innovation und Nachhaltigkeit (Investment, Innovation and Sustainability)", and "Africa: good governance, sustainable investment, peace and security". Transparency of the financial markets, intellectual property and energy efficiency will also be on the agenda, as well as talks about climate change.

On 13 April 2007, Oil Change International released a reported leaked draft of the economic communique. The G8 financial ministers began pre-summit meetings on 30 May 2007.

Protests and demonstrations

As with all recent G8 summits, the event drew large protests, part of the anti-globalization movement. The main demonstration took place 2 June 2007 in the nearby city of Rostock and was the starting event for a week of protests and blockades. Organizers spoke of up to 80,000 participants, while police put the figure at an estimated 25,000. Towards the end of the 2 June protest, violent clashes occurred between protesters and the police, essentially limited to a small area at the harbor. Initially, these drew wide media overstatement, with initial reports claiming nearly 1000 people injured (433 German police officers, 30–33 of them requiring hospitalisation, and 520 protesters, 20 requiring hospitalisation). Later, these figures were disputed. According to police estimates, 2,000 autonomists led the riots, setting fire to a total of 3 cars and setting up makeshift barricades; many peaceful protesters fled the action and ensuing police response in panic. Over 1,000 protesters were detained, and nine of them were tried and condemned during the summit. Hundreds were expelled. According to the European Democratic Lawyers NGO:
The evidence collected in this manner was absolutely inconsistent and as previously noted everybody detained was released after brief periods of time. In fact it all amounts to an illegal system of mass-indexing and psychological terrorism. The police were aware that the judicial authority would not have confirmed these arrests but proceeded equally with a different objective. The aim was not to arrest presumed offenders but the indexing of a great number of demonstrators, the psychological intimidation of the protesters and the creation of false records to be used in other occasions.

A protest also occurred on 2 June 2007 on the river bank opposite the Houses of Parliament in London, principally a reminder of the G8's previous (and, as the protestors saw them, unfulfilled) promises on debt relief, entitled "G8 – The World Can't Wait" and "Wake Up To Poverty". It was a static protest, with small marches converging on in from Lambeth Park and Methodist Central Hall, on a route starting at the foot of Victoria Tower, along the riverbank of Victoria Tower Gardens, the north side of Lambeth Bridge, and the southern riverbank opposite Parliament as far as (but not including) Westminster Bridge. This principally involved the protesters setting off alarm clocks at 2 pm as a "wakeup call" to the G8, and passed without incident.

Accomplishments

The G8 summit is an international event which is observed and reported by news media, but the G8's continuing relevance after more than 30 years is somewhat unclear. More than one analyst suggests that a G-8 summit is not the place to flesh out the details of any difficult or controversial policy issue in the context of a three-day event. Rather, the meeting offers an opportunity to bring a range of complex and sometimes inter-related issues. The G8 summit brings leaders together "not so they can dream up quick fixes, but to talk and think about them together."

Global warming

In a non-binding communiqué issued on Thursday 7 June, it was announced that the G8 nations would 'aim to at least halve global CO2 emissions by 2050'. The details which would enable this salutatory goal to be achieved were left to be negotiated.

It was anticipated that the G8 Environment ministers would work together within the United Nations Framework Convention on Climate Change in a process that would also include the major emerging economies. Groups of countries would also be able to reach additional agreements on achieving the goal outside and in parallel with the United Nations process.

The G8 also announced their desire to use the proceeds from the auction of emission rights and other financial tools to support climate protection projects in developing countries.

The agreement was welcomed by British Prime Minister Tony Blair as 'a major, major step forward'. French president Nicolas Sarkozy would have preferred a binding figure for emissions reduction to have been set. This was apparently blocked by U.S. President George W. Bush until the other major greenhouse gas emitting countries, like India and China, make similar commitments.

Missile defence system

En route to the summit, U.S. president George Bush attempted to assuage Russian concerns over U.S. plans to construct a missile defense complex in Poland and the Czech Republic with remarks appearing to invite Russian participation in the project. At the summit, Russian president Vladimir Putin responded by suggesting that the radar installments for the proposed missile defence system be placed in Azerbaijan. Bush, in turn, responded by describing Putin's ideas as "an interesting suggestion".

G8+5 institutionalisation

Chancellor Angela Merkel announced the establishment of the "Heiligendamm Process" through which the full institutionalisation of the permanent dialogue between the G8 countries and the 5 greatest emerging economies will be implemented.

This process puts an end to the enlargement debate of the G8 into a hypothetical G9, G11, etc. since Merkel declared "The objective is the cohesion of all these countries into a single group which will be called G8+5".

Infrastructure Consortium for Africa
The Infrastructure Consortium for Africa (ICA) was established at the 31st G8 summit at :Gleneagles, Scotland in the United Kingdom in 2005. Since that time, the ICA's annual meeting is traditionally hosted by the country holding the Presidency of the G8—in Russia in 2007.

Controversial video of Sarkozy 

Contrary to French TV, the Belgian TV network diffused a video of French President Nicolas Sarkozy who appeared to be drunk after a chat with Russian President Vladimir Putin.

Possible poisoning of American delegation 

In her written memoirs, former U.S. First Lady Laura Bush suggests that members of the United States delegation, including President and Mrs. Bush, may have been poisoned while at the summit. Later reports suggested the President and First Lady may have been victims of Havana Syndrome.

Location

Heiligendamm is situated on the Baltic near the city Rostock, and is the oldest seaside resort in Germany, developed in 1793 as the seaside meeting place of nobility and high society close to Frederick Francis I, Duke of Mecklenburg. It was selected as the location for the G8 summit due to its isolated location, in anticipation of protests such as those in Gleneagles and St Petersburg. The summit site was fenced off by 12 km long barrier, costing an approximate EUR 12.4 million.

Heiligendamm used to be the summer getaway of the Russian imperial family, who were related to the Dukes of Mecklenburg. For the occasion of the G8 summit, a former summer residence of the imperial family was demolished to make space for a media centre, however it was reconstructed in 2010.

Business opportunity
For some, the G8 summit became a profit-generating event; as for example, the official G8 Summit magazines which have been published under the auspices of the host nations for distribution to all attendees since 1998.

Security precautions included a $17 million, 8-foot-high, 7.5-mile-long fence topped with barbed and razor wire, which encompassed the landward access to the resort; but no protests were reported from the suppliers of the fencing materials.

Gallery

Core G8 participants

See also 
 Intergovernmental Panel on Climate Change
 Kyoto Protocol

References

General references

External links

 Official G8 website: Heiligendamm summit, 2007; n.b., no official website is created for any G7 summit prior to 1995 – see the 21st G7 summit.
 University of Toronto: G8 Research Group, G8 Information Centre
 G8 2007, delegations & documents

General
 Official website of the related anti G8 demonstration / English version (less extensive)
 MODEL G8 YOUTH SUMMIT 2007, G8-Simulation, Berlin – May 2007
 Reported "leaked draft" of Economic Communique
 Reported "leaked draft" of Global Warming Communique (with US Government redlining) 
 G8 TV – daily video stream from the G8
 33rd G8 summit: Issues and controversies (BBC)
 Internationalist Review: The Presence of the Past – How German fear of terrorism in the 1970s might restrict criticism of the G8 today

Security
 Mecklenburg-Vorpommern police force

In the media
 31 May 2007, Agence France-Presse: Bush pushes new climate change plan
 14 May 2007, BBC: US seeks G8 climate text changes

Movie
 Trigger Happy Production: Trouble – Teatime in Heiligendamm .

2007
G8 summit
G8 summit
G8 summit 2007
G8 summit 2007
G8 summit
G8 summit
Events in Mecklenburg-Western Pomerania
2000s in Mecklenburg-Western Pomerania
Bad Doberan
June 2007 events in Europe